Esther Elizabeth Astete Rodríguez is a Peruvian politician who served as the country's Foreign Minister from 18 November 2020 to 14 February 2021.

Education
Astete Rodríguez has a degree in International Relations.

Career
Astete Rodríguez has been a member of Peru's Diplomatic Service since 1975, serving as ambassador to Mexico, Ecuador and Switzerland. She was also Peru's Permanent Representative to the United Nations in Geneva from 2004.

Astete Rodríguez was Peru's under-secretary for Economic Affairs of the Ministry of Foreign Affairs in 2009.

She was appointed Foreign Minister by President Francisco Sagasti in the cabinet of Prime Minister Violeta Bermúdez on 18 November 2020. She was one of eight ministers sworn in after Sagasti and Bermudez replaced President Manuel Merino and Prime Minister Ántero Flores Aráoz (who each served for five days).

Awards and honours
 Medal of the National Order of Merit in the degree of Commander (Ecuador)
 Distinguished Services in the Degree of Grand Cross

References

External links
 Government profile

Foreign ministers of Peru
Female foreign ministers
Ambassadors of Peru to Switzerland
Permanent Representatives of Peru to the United Nations
Living people
1952 births
20th-century diplomats
21st-century diplomats
21st-century Peruvian women politicians
21st-century Peruvian politicians
Ambassadors of Peru to Mexico
Ambassadors of Peru to Ecuador
Peruvian women ambassadors